Yoji Dam  is a dam in the Nagano Prefecture, Japan, completed in 2003.

References

External links

 Nagano Prefecture official tourism web site and blog

Dams in Nagano Prefecture
Dams completed in 2003